Sarvesh Kumar (born 26 April 1989) is an Indian former cricketer. He played two first-class matches for Hyderabad in 2009.

See also
 List of Hyderabad cricketers

References

External links
 

1989 births
Living people
Indian cricketers
Hyderabad cricketers
Cricketers from Hyderabad, India